Victoria Latta (born 10 June 1951 in Auckland), known as Vicky or Vicki, is a New Zealand horsewoman who won two medals at the Olympic Games.

Latta's first major international performance was 11th at the 1990 World Equestrian Games in Stockholm riding Chief. At the 1992 Olympics in Barcelona she was in the New Zealand team which gained the Silver medal. In the individual event Latta, riding Chief, knocked down one rail in the showjumping to slip to fourth place behind fellow-New Zealander Blyth Tait. At the 1996 Olympics in Atlanta Latta, riding Broadcast News, was in the team which won the Bronze medal despite a serious fall during the cross-country which caused her to fail to finish the event.

Biography
While at school Latta won a place at the Royal Ballet School. She later qualified as lawyer before taking equestrianism seriously. After retiring from competitive eventing following the 1996 Olympics Latta returned to the law profession and gained a master's degree. She is also a member of the International Olympic Academy.

References

External links
 
 

New Zealand event riders
1951 births
Living people
Olympic silver medalists for New Zealand
Olympic bronze medalists for New Zealand
Olympic equestrians of New Zealand
New Zealand female equestrians
Equestrians at the 1992 Summer Olympics
Equestrians at the 1996 Summer Olympics
20th-century New Zealand lawyers
Sportspeople from Auckland
Olympic medalists in equestrian
Medalists at the 1996 Summer Olympics
Medalists at the 1992 Summer Olympics